Asota subsimilis is a moth of the family Erebidae first described by Francis Walker in 1864. It is found in Cambodia, Malaysia, Myanmar, Papua New Guinea, Singapore and Thailand. The larval host plant is Ficus fistulosa. 

The wingspan is 51–56 mm.

References

Asota (moth)
Moths of Asia
Moths described in 1864